Jackboots on Whitehall (a.k.a. Nazi Invasion: Team Europe) is a 2010 British adult animated/puppet satirical action comedy film set in an alternative history Second World War, in which Nazi Germany has seized London. The British must band together at Hadrian's Wall if they are to thwart the German invasion. Conceived by Edward and Rory McHenry, it is the first of its kind to feature animatronic puppets and the voices of well-known British actors including Ewan McGregor, Rosamund Pike, Richard E. Grant, Timothy Spall, Richard O'Brien and Richard Griffiths. The film was executive produced by Frank Mannion.

The film premiered at the Edinburgh International Film Festival on 20 June 2010 and was theatrically released in the United Kingdom on 8 October 2010 by Vertigo Films. It received mixed reviews from critics, praising the cast, set design and voice acting but negativity toward the puppetry, action scenes, humor and story, calling it "lifeless, stiff, boring and unfunny" and compared to unfavourable version such as Team America World Police.

Plot
In 1940, Nazi Germany invades Great Britain by drilling under the English Channel and up through the cobblestones on Whitehall, London. In a small village, Chris, a young everyman, rallies the residents to fight back. Joining forces with Churchill's small group of soldiers, the resistance movement retreats to Hadrian's Wall, where the unlikely saviours of the country come from the Scottish Highlands.

Cast
As appearing in Jackboots on Whitehall, (main speaking roles and screen credits identified):

 Ewan McGregor as Chris
 Rosamund Pike as Daisy
 Richard E. Grant as The Vicar
 Timothy Spall as Winston Churchill
 Tom Wilkinson as Albert and Joseph Goebbels
 Dominic West as Billy Fiske
 Alan Cumming as Adolf Hitler and Braveheart
 Sanjeev Bhaskar as Major Rupee
 Richard Griffiths as Hermann Göring
 Richard O'Brien as Heinrich Himmler
 Stephen Merchant as Tom
 Pam Ferris as Matron Rutty
 Hugh Fraser as Gaston and the Newsreader
 Tobias Menzies as Captain English and Bernard Montgomery
 Martyn Ellis as Zeppelin Captain
 Alexander Armstrong as Red Leader
 Rory McHenry
 Caroline Duff
 Charlotte Moore
 James Hicks
 Brian Conley
 Jimmy Boyle
 Edward McHenry
 Benedick Blythe
 Stephen Lord
 Jonathan Barlow
 Jana Agnew
 Karl Richards
 Mark Taylor
 Neil Newbon

In using real-life characters to embody a more accurate portrayal, some characters are easily recognizable. While Battle of Britain hero and American pilot Billy Fiske appears, he embodies the characteristics of screen legend Clark Gable. Spall had previously portrayed Churchill in The King's Speech (2010).

Production

Writer-directors Edward and Rory McHenry created several supermarionation puppets that featured accurately rendered period uniforms, architecture and military equipment.

Theatrical release and premiere
Jackboots on Whitehall was released in cinemas on 8 October 2010 in the United Kingdom by Vertigo Films and premiered on 20 June 2010 at the EIFF.

Critical reception

Robbie Collin, of the News Of The World, gave the film 4 stars summarising it as "Stupid, throwaway nonsense - and that's the whole idea".Total Film Magazine also  gave the film 4 stars stating "Jackboots wittily merges war flick iconography, Inglorious revisionism and Team America silliness to create a hilarious, endearing one-off". While The Guardian praised the "impressive all-star vocal cast" in Jackboots on Whitehall, and called it a "labour of love" by its writer-directors, concluded it was "amiably intentioned but desperately weak in terms of script" comparing it unfavourably with Wallace and Gromit and Team America: World Police. Other reviews were of a similar nature; the review in The Telegraph characterized the film as "an enterprising comedy but ultimately a boorish overkill." it currently has a 44% rating on Rotten Tomatoes.

Box office
The film grossed $20,776 worldwide.

Home media
Jackboots on Whitehall was released on DVD and Blu-ray on 26 July 2011 by Sony Pictures Home Entertainment.

Awards

Soundtrack

All music was composed by Guy Michelmore.

Battle Of Britain
Harvest And Village
Nazi Airship Attack
Punjabi's Last Stand
Light The Beacons
Last Of The Few
Retreat To Scotland
Battle Of Downing Street
Chris To The Rescue
Freedom
Nazis In London
Travelling North
Punjabi's Escape From London
Hadrian's Wall
Aurora Borealis
Where Is Herr Churchill?
The Morning After
A Highland Morning
Chris' Mission
Facing The Enemy
Jerusalem - Performed by Rosamund Pike, Tom Wilkinson, Stephen Merchant, Sanjeev Bhaskar, Pam Ferris and Cast
Defending The Wall
The Battle
Facing Defeat
Scottish Attack
You're A Scotsman
The Fallen
Rule Britannia
Scots Revenge
Whitehall March
Scotland The Brave
Jackboots Demo

See also
 Hypothetical Axis victory in World War II
Operation Sea Lion
One Hundred Years of Evil

References

External links
 
 
 
 Behind the scenes on Netribution
 Jackboots on Whitehall reviews at Best For Film

2010 films
2010 action comedy films
British action comedy films
British satirical films
English-language Scottish films
English-language Spanish films
English-language Belgian films
Cultural depictions of Adolf Hitler
British alternative history films
British aviation films
Battle of Britain films
Cultural depictions of Winston Churchill
Films set in 1940
Films set in London
Films set in Scotland
Films about World War II alternate histories
Vertigo Films films
2010 comedy films
Belgian animated films
2010s English-language films
2010s British films